This is a list of lost silent films that were released from 1925 to 1929.

References 

Silent, 1925-29
History of film
Lists of 1920s films
1925 in film
1926 in film
1927 in film
1928 in film
1929 in film
1925-related lists
1926-related lists
1927-related lists
1928-related lists
1929-related lists